The banded whiptail, Coelorinchus fasciatus, is a species of rattail found circumpolar in the Great Southern Ocean at depths of between 70 and 1,100 m.  Its length is between 25 and 45 cm.

References

 
 Tony Ayling & Geoffrey Cox, Collins Guide to the Sea Fishes of New Zealand,  (William Collins Publishers Ltd, Auckland, New Zealand 1982) 

Macrouridae
Fish described in 1878
Taxa named by Albert Günther